Esmirtazapine (ORG-50,081) is a tetracyclic antidepressant drug which was under development by Organon for the treatment of insomnia and vasomotor symptoms (e.g., hot flashes) associated with menopause. Esmirtazapine is the (S)-(+)-enantiomer of mirtazapine and possesses similar overall pharmacology, including inverse agonist actions at H1 and 5-HT2 receptors and antagonist actions at α2-adrenergic receptors.   

Notably, esmirtazapine has a shorter half life of around 10 hours, compared to R-mirtazapine and racemic mixture, which has a half-life of 18-40 hours. Merck has run several studies on low dose (3 - 4.5 mg) esmirtazapine for the treatment of insomnia. It is attractive for treating insomnia since it is a potent H1-inhibitor and a 5-HT2A antagonist. Unlike low-dose mirtazapine, the half life (10 hours) is short enough that next-day sedation may be manageable, however, for people with CYP2D6 polymorphisms, which constitute a sizable fraction of the population, the half-life is expected to be quite a bit longer. Merck researchers claimed that the incidence of next-day sedation was not a problem in one of their studies, but this claim has been challenged (15% of patients complained of daytime sleepiness vs 3.5% in the placebo group).

In March 2010, Merck terminated its internal clinical development program for esmirtazapine for hot flashes and insomnia, "for strategic reasons".

See also
 Cidoxepin

References

External links

Alpha-2 blockers
Enantiopure drugs
H1 receptor antagonists
Schering-Plough brands
Merck & Co. brands
Noradrenergic and specific serotonergic antidepressants
Serotonin receptor antagonists
Tetracyclic antidepressants